Neduntheevu or Nedunthivu (also known by its Dutch name Delft) is an island in the Palk Strait, northern Sri Lanka. This island is named as Delft in the Admiralty Chart unlike the other islands, whose names are Tamil. The island's area is 50 km2 and it is roughly oval-shaped. Its length is 8 km and its maximum width about 6 km.

Neduntheevu is a flat island surrounded by shallow waters and beaches of coral chunks and sand.  It is home to a small population of Tamil people, mostly living in quiet compounds close to the northern coast.  The vegetation is of a semi-arid tropical type, with palmyra palms, dry shrubs and grasses that grow on the pale grey porous coralline soil. Papayas and bananas grow close to the local people's homes. In the western coast of the island there are remains of a 1000-year-old temple built by the Chola Dynasty as well as the ruins of a Dutch colonial fort. The water is slightly brackish, and it is taken from shallow wells using buckets made from palmyra palm leaves. A naval battle was fought off the coast of the island in 2008 during the Sri-Lankan Civil War.  There are feral ponies on the island, descendants of forebears abandoned there in the Dutch period.

The island was named after the Dutch city of Delft by Rijckloff van Goens. He named the eight most important islands after Dutch cities.

Inscriptions 
The marine archaeologists from the Maritime Archaeology Unit (MAU) of Central Cultural Fund (CCF) established in Galle in their archaeological explorations carried out in Delft Island in August 2017 discovered two Tamil inscriptions dated to 14-15 century and one Sinhala Prakrit inscription dated to 1st or 2nd century that have not been hitherto been revealed.

See also 
 Queen's Tower (Neduntheevu)

Gallery

References 

Delft DS Division
Islands of Jaffna District